Jodi, is a collective of two internet artists, Joan Heemskerk (born 1968 in Kaatsheuvel, the Netherlands) and Dirk Paesmans (born 1965 in Brussels, Belgium), created in 1994. They were some of the first artists to create Web art and later started to create software art and artistic computer game modification. Their most well-known art piece is their website wwwwwwwww.jodi.org, which is a landscape of intricate designs made in basic HTML. JODI is represented by Upstream Gallery, Amsterdam.

The artists 
Joan Heemskerk was born in 1968 in Kaatsheuvel, the Netherlands, and Dirk Paesmans was born in 1965 in Brussels, Belgium. They both have a background in photography and video art and studied at San Jose State University in California.  Paesmans also studied at Kunstakademie Dusseldorf with the founder of video art Nam June Paik.

Both Heemskerk and Paesmans live and work out of the Netherlands.

Artworks 
In 1999 they began the practice of modifying old video games such as Wolfenstein 3D to create art mods like SOD. Their efforts were celebrated in the 1999 Webby Awards, where they took top prize in the category of "net art." Jodi used their 5-word acceptance speech (a Webby Award tradition) to criticize the event with the words "Ugly commercial sons of bitches." Further video game modifications soon followed for Quake, Jet Set Willy, and the latest, Max Payne 2 (2006), to create a new set of art games. Jodi's approach to game modification is comparable in many ways to deconstructivism in architecture because they would disassemble the game to its basic parts, and reassemble it in ways that do not make intuitive sense. In one of their more well-known modifications of Quake places, the player inside a closed cube with swirling black-and-white patterns on each side. The pattern is the result of a glitch in the game engine discovered by the artists, presumably, through trial and error; it is generated live as the Quake engine tries, and fails, to visualize the interior of a cube with black-and-white checkered wallpaper.

"Screen Grab" Period (2002- ) 
Since 2002, they have been in what has been called their "Screen Grab" period, making video works by recording the computer monitor's output while working, playing video games, or coding. Jodi's "Screen Grab" period began with the four-screen video installation My%Desktop (2002), which premiered at the Plugin Media Lab in Basel. The piece appeared to depict mammoth Mac OS 9 computers running amok: opening windows cascaded across the screen, error messages squawked, and files replicated themselves endlessly. But this was not a computer gone haywire, but a computer user gone haywire. To make this video, Jodi pointed-and-clicked and dragged-and-dropped so frantically, it seemed that no human could be in control of such chaos. As graphics exploded across the screen, the viewer gradually realized that what had initially appeared to be a computer glitch was really the work of an irrational, playful, or crazed human. 

Their exhibition Jodi: goodmorning goodnight was on display at the Whitney Museum from 2013–2015. Another project, OXO (2018), was displayed at the Lightbox Gallery at Harvard University. The piece is an interactive multichannel installation based on old computer games and tic-tac-toe. "Difference Engine" was also on display at the And/Or Gallery in Pasadena, California, during the same year. The exhibition marked Jodi's first solo show in the Los Angeles area.

A 2012 Vice magazine article said JODI's work "underlines the innate anarchy of the online medium, an arena that we've come to recognize as public but one that the duo constantly undermines and tweaks to their own purposes."

As of October 2019, JODI’s iconic work My%Desktop (2002), is part of the permanent collection presentation of the new MoMA (Museum of Modern Art) in New York. The work is presented as a monumental installation of four adjacent projections, showing screen grabs of JODI’s desktop-performance.

Collections
The work of JODI is represented in the permanent collection of the Museum of Modern Art,  ZKM Center for Art and Media Karlsruhe, among other venues.

See also 

 net.art
 Superbad.com
 New media art

References

Sources

 
 
 
 

 Conner, Michael. (2013). Required Reading: A Closer Look at JODI's 'Untitled Game'. Rhizome Journal. http://rhizome.org/editorial/2013/oct/16/required-reading-closer-look-jodis-untitled-game/
 Galloway, Alexander. (2016) Jodi's Infrastructure. E-flux Journal #74. http://www.e-flux.com/journal/74/59810/jodi-s-infrastructure/
 Saltiel, Natalie. (2011). From the Rhizome Artbase: %20 Wrong (2000)-JODI. Rhizome Journal. http://rhizome.org/editorial/2011/jul/5/20wrong-jodi-artbase/?ref=search_title.

External links 

 jodi.org
 Full archive of Jodi
 Talk with Dirk Peasmans, May 2006
 Artists' Biography and list of video works by JODI at Electronic Arts Intermix eai.org.
 Thomas Dreher: History of Computer Art, chap. VI.3.2 HTML Art  with a wider explanation of one of Jodi´s early works.
 map.jodi.org
 sod.jodi.org
From the Rhizome Artbase: %20wrong (2000)- JODI

Net.artists
Belgian contemporary artists
Webby Award winners